Béatrice La Palme (July 27, 1878 – January 8, 1921), was a Canadian soprano opera singer, violinist, and music teacher.

Biography
Born on July 27, 1878 in Belœil, Quebec, she studied violin with Frantz Jehin-Prume. La Palme performed in public in 1894 before leaving for London in 1895. She was the first winner of the Donald Smith, 1st Baron Strathcona and Mount Royal scholarship to the Royal College of Music, where she studied with Enrique Fernandez Arbos. Her vocal coach was Gustave Garcia and she had the opportunity to sing at a Royal College of Music concert in July 1898. In October 1898 she was sponsored by Donald Smith, 1st Baron Strathcona and Mount Royal.

She made her debut at Covent Garden in 1903 and at the Opéra-Comique in Paris on 10 September 1905 in Mireille. There she created the role of Madelon in Fortunio, and also sang Colette in La basoche, Micaëla in Carmen, Betly in Le Chalet, Marie in La fille du régiment, Souzouki in Madame Butterfly, Javotte in Manon, Ellen/Rose in Lakmé and Mignon.

She died in Montreal on January 8, 1921, and was entombed at the Notre Dame des Neiges Cemetery in Montreal.

References

1878 births
1921 deaths
Canadian operatic sopranos
19th-century Canadian women opera singers
Singers from Quebec
Burials at Notre Dame des Neiges Cemetery
People from Beloeil, Quebec